Presbyterian Manse may refer to:

Presbyterian Manse (Anchorage, Kentucky)
Presbyterian Manse (Natchez, Mississippi)
Presbyterian Parsonage (Westerville, Ohio)
Presbyterian Manse (Edisto Island, South Carolina)
Presbyterian Manse (Jefferson, Texas)

See also
List of Presbyterian churches
Presbyterian Church (disambiguation)